Mohd Anwar bin Mohd Nor  ( December 3, 1951, in Alor Gajah, Malacca, is the 15th and the former Chief of Defence Forces. He is the first head of the Malaysian Armed Forces (MAF) to be appointed from the Royal Malaysian Navy (RMN). For over five decades previously, the Chief of the Defence Force had traditionally been a 4-star General from the Malaysian Army. Anwar broke the tradition by being appointed the first Navy Admiral to be promoted to Chief of Defence Force.

After retirement
After retirement, Anwar involved in politics and was appointed as a Senator of Dewan Negara for one term from 23 April 2015 to 22 April 2018, representing United Malays National Organisation (UMNO), a component of Barisan Nasional (BN) coalition. He also served as the chairman of the Armed Forces Fund Board or Lembaga Tabung Angkatan Tentera (LTAT).

Honours
  : 
 Officer of the Order of the Defender of the Realm (K.M.N.) (1991)
 Companion of the Order of Loyalty to the Royal Family of Malaysia (J.S.D.) (1993)
 Companion of the Order of Loyalty to the Crown of Malaysia (J.S.M.) (1997)
 Commander of the Order of Loyalty to the Royal Family of Malaysia (P.S.D.) - Datuk (2002)
 Commander of the Order of the Defender of the Realm (P.M.N.) - Tan Sri (2005)

 Knight Commander of the Order of Taming Sari (D.P.T.S.) - Dato’ Pahlawan (1997)
 Knight Grand Commander of the Order of Taming Sari (S.P.T.S.) - Dato’ Seri Panglima (2004)

 Knight Commander of the Order of the Crown of Selangor (D.P.M.S.) - Dato’ (2003)
 Knight Grand Companion of the Order of Sultan Sharafuddin Idris Shah (S.S.I.S.) - Dato’ Setia (2004)
 :
 Knight Commander of the Exalted Order of Malacca (D.C.S.M.) - Datuk Wira (2006)
 :
 Knight Grand Commander of the Order of the Life of the Crown of Kelantan (S.J.M.K.) - Dato’ (2007)
 :
 Knight Commander of the Order of Loyalty to Sultan Abdul Halim Mu'adzam Shah (D.H.M.S.) – Dato' Paduka (2007)

Foreign 
: 
 1st Class of the Star of Yudha Dharma (2006)
 :
 Officer of the Legion of Honour (2007)
 :
 First Class of the Order of Paduka Keberanian Laila Terbilang (DPKT) - Dato Paduka Seri

References

1951 births
Living people
Knights Commander of the Order of the Crown of Selangor
People from Malacca
Malaysian people of Malay descent
Malaysian Muslims
Royal Malaysian Navy personnel
Members of the Dewan Negara
Officers of the Order of the Defender of the Realm
Companions of the Order of Loyalty to the Crown of Malaysia
Commanders of the Order of Loyalty to the Royal Family of Malaysia
Commanders of the Order of the Defender of the Realm
Commanders of the Legion of Merit
Admirals
21st-century Malaysian people
Companions of the Order of Loyalty to the Royal Family of Malaysia